Bruno Veiga Mattos (born 9 January 1990 in Mesquita, Rio de Janeiro), known as Bruno Veiga, is a Brazilian footballer who plays for Duque de Caxias as a forward.

References

External links
Bruno Veiga at ZeroZero

1990 births
Living people
Sportspeople from Rio de Janeiro (state)
Brazilian footballers
Association football forwards
Campeonato Brasileiro Série B players
Campeonato Brasileiro Série C players
Campeonato Brasileiro Série D players
Fluminense FC players
Clube Náutico Capibaribe players
Duque de Caxias Futebol Clube players
Boavista Sport Club players
Joinville Esporte Clube players
Associação Desportiva São Caetano players
Associação Desportiva Cabofriense players
Vila Nova Futebol Clube players
Paysandu Sport Club players
Mogi Mirim Esporte Clube players
Cuiabá Esporte Clube players
Centro Sportivo Alagoano players
Nova Iguaçu Futebol Clube players
Villa Nova Atlético Clube players